Phaleni  is a village development committee in Lamjung District in the Gandaki Zone of northern-central Nepal. At the time of the 1881 Nepal census it had a population of 57327 people living in 286 individual households. Phaleni was the first king in Nepal village and married six wife and 29 children and 64  grandchildren after the death in 1901

References

External links
UN map of the municipalities of Lamjung District

Populated places in Lamjung District